The United States Penitentiary, Allenwood (USP Allenwood) is a high security United States federal prison in Pennsylvania. It is part of the Allenwood Federal Correctional Complex (FCC Allenwood) and is operated by the Federal Bureau of Prisons, a division of the United States Department of Justice.

FCC Allenwood is located on US Route 15 in Gregg Township, Union County, near White Deer.

Facility and programs
USP Allenwood has four two-level housing units each of which consists of four 16-cell ranges around a central dayroom where inmates can congregate during the times they are allowed outside their cells. Most cells house two inmates each.  Recreational and counseling facilities are located adjacent to the housing units. The outer perimeter is secured by a double line of fencing with rolled barbed wire on the ground in between the fences. The inner fence is equipped with a perimeter intrusion detection system and a road for patrol vehicles runs along the outer fence. Correction officers man six guard towers at each corner of the security fence and a seventh within the fence.

Educational programs include GED, ESL, adult continuing education, vocational training, correspondence classes, and evening college classes. Inmates work in a UNICOR upholstery factory and institutional maintenance jobs such as food service and building repair. Medical, psychological and drug treatment services are also available.

Notable incidents

1996 murder
In April 1996, USP Allenwood inmate David Paul Hammer strangled fellow inmate Andrew Hunt Marti to death with a piece of homemade cord. Hammer and Marti were cellmates in the Special Housing Unit, where especially violent inmates are held. Writing on a website dedicated to his case in 2001, Hammer could not ‘attribute any motive’ to his actions. Hammer, a career criminal who was serving a 1,200-year sentence for crimes including larceny, shooting with intent to kill, kidnapping and making bomb threats, subsequently pleaded guilty to Marti's murder and was sentenced to death.

The death sentence was vacated in 2006 after a federal judge found that prosecutors withheld evidence during the penalty phase that would have bolstered Hammer's claim that he and Marti were having consensual sex.  In July 2014, another federal judge concurred, ruling that a life sentence was appropriate based upon multiple circumstances, including Hammer's acceptance of responsibility and remorsefulness, his extended family history of dysfunction, abuse and mental illness, his mental and emotional impairments and his self-improvement, specifically citing Hammer's writing to at-risk children and counseling them against engaging in criminal conduct.

2005 murder
On September 28, 2005, USP Allenwood inmates Ritz Williams (47085-008) and Shawn Cooya (48896-008) stabbed a fellow inmate, 50-year-old Alvin Allery, ten times with a homemade knife and repeatedly kicked him in the head and torso, causing Allery's death. Williams and Cooya were already serving lengthy sentences, Williams for murder and Cooya for weapons violations. A subsequent investigation revealed that Williams and Cooya planned the attack in advance. In 2013, Williams and Cooya pleaded guilty to first-degree murder and were sentenced to life in prison. As of March 2022, Williams is currently incarcerated at USP Atwater and Cooya at USP Florence ADMAX.

2020 attack 
On December 7, 2020, two correctional officers were injured after one was stabbed in the neck and eye by convicted Canadian terrorist, Abdulrahman el Bahnasawy (75868-054). Both officers were taken via ambulance to Geisinger Medical Center in Danville. Both guards survived, with one losing an eye. El Bahnasawy was transferred to USP Lewisburg. In April 2021, el Bahnasawy was transferred from Lewisburg to ADX Florence.

Notable inmates (current and former)

Organized crime
All are serving life sentences.

Other crimes

Terrorists

See also

 List of U.S. federal prisons
 Federal Bureau of Prisons
 Incarceration in the United States

References

External links
 United States Federal Bureau of Prisons FCC Allenwood

Allenwood
Buildings and structures in Union County, Pennsylvania
Allenwood
1993 establishments in Pennsylvania